"Satellite" is a song written by American songwriter Julie Frost, and Danish songwriter John Gordon. It is best known as Germany's winning entry at the Eurovision Song Contest 2010, performed by German singer Lena Meyer-Landrut.

Meyer-Landrut's version of the song was chosen via televoting during the national Eurovision pre-selection show Unser Star für Oslo (Our Star for Oslo) on 12 March 2010. It was made available for digital download the following day, becoming Germany's fastest selling digital release ever. It debuted at number one in the German singles chart and has since been certified double platinum. On 29 May 2010, it won the Eurovision Song Contest 2010, scoring 246 points. Following its Eurovision victory, "Satellite" went on to be a commercial success across Europe, topping the single charts in six countries and receiving a number of Gold and Platinum certifications.

A version by Jennifer Braun, the runner-up of Unser Star für Oslo, was also released as a single, and charted in Germany.

Production and song selection 
"Satellite" is a pop song written by American songwriter Julie Frost and Danish songwriter John Gordon. Frost told HitQuarters that the song is about "unconditional love". The lyrics describe the thoughts of a woman in love ("I got it bad for you"), who is frustrated at being ignored ("I went everywhere for you/ I even did my hair for you/ I bought new underwear they're blue/ And I wore it just the other day.") and compares herself to a lonely traveller ("Like a satellite I'm in orbit all the way around you/ And I would fall out into the night/ Can't go a minute without your love."), but on the other hand seems to draw a kind of masochistic pleasure from her pain. Gordon has said it is a "bubbly" song, "pretty easy and sweet with cheerful lyrics" and "three chords". Frost, the song's lyricist, explained, "It deals with all the crazy hidden things a girl does and feels when she is in love. A man can make her feel everything at once, joyful but also tormented and helpless."

A couple of years later Gordon's publisher Iceberg Publishing decided to send the song to Valicon, a large German production company, and the producer André ‘Brix’ Buchmann, who then submitted for consideration to Universal Music Germany. The song was one of approximately 300 titles for the talent show Unser Star für Oslo (Our Star for Oslo), a newly created national television programme to select the German entry for the Eurovision Song Contest 2010. "Satellite" was eventually chosen as one of four songs (alongside "Bee", "I Care for You" and "Love Me") to be performed in the final of Unser Star für Oslo on 12 March 2010. A ballad version was sung by contestant Jennifer Braun. Through televoting, the audience chose "Satellite" to be Meyer-Landrut's designated song in case she won the show. In a second round of voting, Meyer-Landrut with "Satellite" was picked as Germany's entry for the 55th Eurovision Song Contest.

The recording of "Satellite" was produced by John Gordon, André "Brix" Buchmann, Ingo Politz and Bernd Wendtland. It was remastered by Sascha "Busy" Bühren.

Release 
On 13 March 2010, all six songs performed in the final of Unser Star für Oslo were made available for digital download on iTunes Germany and Musicload.de. The maxi single of Meyer-Landrut's "Satellite", which also includes her other two songs from the final, "Bee" and "Love Me", was released three days later on 16 March 2010. All songs were released on the specially created record label USFO, a cooperation between Universal Music Germany and Raab TV/Brainpool, the production companies of Unser Star für Oslo.

"Satellite" sold over 100,000 downloads in its first week, becoming Germany's fastest selling digital release ever. It debuted at number one in the German singles chart, and was eligible to be certified gold after the first week and platinum after the fourth week of its release. The song remained at number one for five consecutive weeks in Germany. After winning the Eurovision Song Contest on 29 May 2010, "Satellite" regained its top position in Germany for one week and also peaked at number one in Denmark, Finland, Norway, Sweden and Switzerland. It also topped Billboard's European Hot 100 singles chart, being the first Eurovision song to achieve this.

With 464,000 downloads sold, "Satellite" is the second-best selling download single in Germany since 2006, when such records began being kept. It is behind Lady Gaga's hit "Poker Face", which was downloaded more than 500,000 times.

"Satellite" is included on Meyer-Landrut's debut album My Cassette Player, which was released on 7 May 2010. It is also available on the Kinect Xbox 360 game, Dance Central 2 and the PAL (European and Australian) version of Just Dance 3.

Music video 
The music video for "Satellite" was shot during the night of the final on the television stage of Unser Star für Oslo in Cologne. It features no story line or any change of scenery, but instead focuses entirely on Meyer-Landrut as she sings and dances on a darkened stage with some spotlights behind her.

On 16 March 2010, the video premiered on public broadcaster Das Erste right before Germany's most-watched evening news bulletin Tagesschau. Shortly after, it was simultaneously shown on four private stations (Sat.1, ProSieben, kabel eins, N24) before the start of their evening prime time programmes.

The video reached 67 million views on YouTube as of May 2021.

Eurovision Song Contest 

"Satellite" was Germany's entry for the Eurovision Song Contest 2010. By representing a "Big four" country, it was automatically qualified for the final. Germany received a wild card during the running order draw, which allowed the German representatives to pick the country's position for the final. They chose position 22 out of the 25 spots. Meyer-Landrut arrived one week before the show in Oslo, Norway, where she completed five rehearsals of "Satellite". Prior to the final, the song was considered as one of the favourites. Bookmakers regarded it second favourite behind Azerbaijan's "Drip Drop", while Google projected it would win based on search volume in the participating countries. According to Norway's Aftenposten, Meyer-Landrut received the most attention of all participants.

The final was held on 29 May 2010 at Oslo's Telenor Arena. Appearing fourth from last, Meyer-Landrut wore a simple black dress and performed on a bare stage with four backing singers. Her pared-back presentation reflected a trend that has had success at recent Eurovisions, as it did not feature any form of choreography, dancers or elaborate stage show. "Satellite" received a total of 246 points, giving Germany its first victory since 1982, and the first win as a unified country. It also became the first winning song from a Big-Four country since Katrina and the Waves' victory for the United Kingdom in 1997. The song won over Turkey's entry "We Could Be the Same" with a margin of 76 points, the third-biggest in Eurovision history, after Sweden's participant Loreen managed a margin of 113 points in the 2012 contest and Alexander Rybak's margin of 169 points in the 2009 contest. "Satellite" received the maximum 12 points nine times and received points from all but five countries.

Formats and track listings

Credits and personnel 
 Lead vocals – Lena Meyer-Landrut
 Additional vocals – Kayna
 Audio remastering – Sascha "Busy" Bühren
 Producers – John Gordon, André "Brix" Buchmann, Ingo Politz, Bernd Wendtland for Valicon
 Music – Julie Frost, John Gordon
 Lyrics – Julie Frost
 Label: USFO for Universal Music Deutschland

Charts and certifications

Weekly charts

Year-end charts

Certifications

Awards and nominations

Jennifer Braun version

"Satellite" was also one of three songs performed by Braun in the final of Unser Star für Oslo. However, the audience chose Lena Meyer-Landrut and her version of "Satellite" for the contest in Oslo. Braun's version was also made available for digital download on 13 March 2010 and is also featured on Braun's maxi single "I Care for You". It subsequently charted in Germany, reaching a peak position of #32.

Credits and personnel
Lead vocals – Jennifer Braun
Music – Julie Frost, John Gordon
Lyrics – Julie Frost
Label: USFO for Universal Deutschland

Chart performance

Stefan Raab version

During the opening act of the 2011 Eurovision Song Contest in Düsseldorf Stefan Raab performed a Rockabilly version of this song where Meyer-Landrut was briefly involved as duet partner. The studio version of the song was released as a single and charted #24 in Germany.

The original version of the song also re-entered the iTunes singles charts in several countries.

Other versions
Satellite was covered several times, including in German with the title Schland Oh Schland by the student's band Uwu Lena in 2010 and in Turkish titled Laviva for a chocolate bar commercial by the food company Ülker in 2013.

See also 
List of number-one hits in Denmark
List of Finnish number-one hits
List of number-one hits of 2010 (Germany)
List of number-one hits in Norway
List of number-one hits of 2010 (Sweden)
List of number-one hits of 2010 (Switzerland)
List of European number-one hits of 2010

Notes

External links 
 Official music video at YouTube
 Eurovision profile and lyrics at Eurovision.tv
 
 Unser Star für Oslo live performance by Lena Meyer-Landrut at Unser-Star-fuer-Oslo.de
 Unser Star für Oslo live performance by Jennifer Braun at Unser-Star-fuer-Oslo.de
 Eurovision Song Contest 2010 live performance by Lena Meyer-Landrut at Eurovision.ndr.de

2010 debut singles
Lena Meyer-Landrut songs
Eurovision songs of 2010
Eurovision Song Contest winning songs
Eurovision songs of Germany
European Hot 100 Singles number-one singles
Number-one singles in Denmark
Number-one singles in Finland
Number-one singles in Germany
Number-one singles in Iceland
Number-one singles in Norway
Number-one singles in Sweden
Number-one singles in Switzerland
Songs written by Julie Frost
English-language German songs
2010 songs
Universal Music Group singles